Natasha Zvereva was the defending champion but lost in the second round to Lisa Raymond.

Magdalena Maleeva won in the final 7–5, 7–6 against Lisa Raymond.

Seeds
A champion seed is indicated in bold text while text in italics indicates the round in which that seed was eliminated. The top four seeds received a bye to the second round.

  Natasha Zvereva (second round)
  Gabriela Sabatini (semifinals)
  Magdalena Maleeva (champion)
  Brenda Schultz (quarterfinals)
  Amy Frazier (quarterfinals)
  Lori McNeil (second round)
  Zina Garrison-Jackson (semifinals)
  Chanda Rubin (quarterfinals)

Draw

Final

Section 1

Section 2

External links
 1995 Ameritech Cup draw

Ameritech Cup
1995 WTA Tour